Alexander Cameron (1747–1828) was a Roman Catholic bishop who served as the Vicar Apostolic of the Lowland District, Scotland.

Life

Born in Braemar, Aberdeenshire on 28 July 1747, he was the son of James Cameron and Margery Macktinosh. He entered the Scots College in Rome on 22 December 1764, and took the oath there on 1 June 1765. Seven years later, he received Holy Orders as a subdeacon on 19 January 1772, a deacon on 26 January 1772, and a priest on 2 February 1772, all from Francesco Maria Piccolomini, Bishop of Pienza, in the chapel of the Scots College. He was appointed the Coadjutor Vicar Apostolic of the Lowland District and Titular Bishop of Maximianopolis in Palaestina by the Holy See on 19 September 1797. He was consecrated to the Episcopate in Madrid by Antonio Tavira Almazán, Bishop of Salamanca on 28 October 1798. Following the retirement of Bishop George Hay on 24 August 1805, he automatically succeeded as the Vicar Apostolic of Lowland District.

In the early 19th century he is listed as living at 6 James Place in Edinburgh.

Twenty years later, he retired on 20 August 1825, and died on 7 February 1828, aged 80.

References

1747 births
1828 deaths
19th-century Roman Catholic bishops in Scotland
Apostolic vicars of Scotland
People from Marr
Scottish Roman Catholic bishops